Los Ranchitos, California may refer to:
Los Ranchitos, Marin County, California
Los Ranchitos, Riverside County, California